Bruno Lucia (born 27 January 1960) is an Australian stand-up comedian, actor and performer.

With his bald, clean-shaven head, and Italian descent, Lucia became popular in the early 1990s with his role as entertainment agent Wayne Lovett on television sitcom All Together Now (with Jon English and Rebecca Gibney), memorable in part due to his character's catchphrase "Chickybabe!"

Hailing from Adelaide, he is currently based in Los Angeles in the United States touring and performing comedy and musical comedy internationally.

Collection of works

Discography
1997: Life After Chicki Babe
2012: Live - Australia's Most Wanted Comedy Rock N' Roller

Filmography

Television
The Dunera Boys (1985)
Ring of Scorpio (1990)
A Country Practice (as Mystery Patient, S10E04) (1990)
All Together Now (as Wayne Lovett) (1991–1993)
Under Melbourne Tonight (7 December 1995)Stingers (as Mick Dooley, S05E05) (2002)Legacy of the Silver Shadow'' (as Mr. Vesuvius, S01E10) (2003)

References

External links
Official website

1960 births
Living people
Australian male comedians
Australian people of Italian descent
Male actors from Adelaide